This is a complete list of Azerbaijani chess title-holders as of October 2019.

Grandmasters

International Masters

Women Grandmasters

Women International Masters

See also
 Chess in Azerbaijan
 Azerbaijan Chess Federation
 List of Azerbaijanis
 List of chess players

External links
 Elo rating list of top 100 Azerbaijani chess players FIDE
 Official Website of the Azerbaijan Chess Federation (ACF) 
 Azerbaijan Chess Federation 

 
Azerbaijani
Chess players
Chess in Azerbaijan